Bata Mahadeva (Mukteswara Shiva) is a Hindu temple, dedicate to Lord Shiva. This is one of the oldest temple in Bhubaneswar (The Temple city of India), a well known heritage place and capital of Odisha.

Approach 
It is located at the middle of the Bindusagar road, leading from Kedar-Gouri Lane to Lingaraja temple. It is a living temple and facing towards north. The deity enshrined here is a Siva lingam with a circular yoni pitha made of sandstone.

Tradition & legends

According to local legend when Mahadeva visited Ekamra Nagari he took rest at this place. Since it is located at the middle of the road it is known as Bata Mahadeva.
Ownership: This temple is not under any private ownership and comes under public property. This temple is under the control of Lingaraja temple administration.

Age: According to architectural features, this temple is built around 15th to 16th century CE. Property type: This is a building made up of stones and its typology is Pidha Deul.

Use: Currently this temple is used for worship and in past it was used for the same purpose.

Cultural significance: Pinda is offered to the ancestors and this temple is mainly used for this purpose.

Surrounding 

The temple is surrounded by road on all its four sides and
Ananta Basudeba Temple is in the east at a distance of 15.00 m, Bindusagar in the west is at a distance of 10.00 m, Lingaraja temple in the south is at a distance of 100 m.

 Orientation: The temple is facing towards north.
  Architectural features (Plan and Elevation): On plan, the temple has a square sanctum measuring 1.95 m2. It is pancharatha on plan as distinguished by a central raha and a pair of anuratha paga, and kanika pagas on the either side of the raha. On elevation, the vimana is of pidha order measuring 1.95 m in height. From bottom to the top the temple has bada, gandi and mastaka. Bada measuring 1.05 m in height is without any moulding. Gandi consisting of two receding tiers measure 1.30 m in height. Mastaka measures 0.60 m.

Decorative features 

 Doorjambs: The doorjamb measuring 0.82 m in height and 0.53 m in width are plain.
 Building material: This temple is made up of Sandstone. 
 Construction techniques: Dry masonry
 Construction Style: Pidha deul

Conservation 

 State of preservation: This temple is in comparatively fair condition due to proper care and recent renovation work.
 Structural problems: Western wall of the gandi is partly broken.
 Repairs and Maintenance: The temple was repaired and recently maintained by local people. The temple is covered with marbles and lime wash. (Reference:  Dr. Sadasiba Pradhan and team, Dated 21.10.2006)

References 

Book: Lesser Known Monuments of Bhubaneswar by Dr. Sadasiba Pradhan

External links 
 

Shiva temples in Odisha
Hindu temples in Bhubaneswar